Ritzy is a lost 1927 silent film

Ritzy may also refer to:

Ritzy Bryan of The Joy Formidable
Ritzy Lee of The Del-Vikings
Ritzy, 1990s nightclub in Nottingham "Call Me"
The Ritzy Cinema in Brixton